Ulrikke Hansen Døvigen (born 4 February 1971) is a Norwegian actress. Her mother is the actress Kjersti Døvigen, and her father was the jazz musician Ole Jacob Hansen, who died when Ulrikke was 27. Educated in England, she has performed both at Det norske teatret ("Wendy Darling" in Peter Pan) and at Nationaltheatret (e.g. "Kaja Fossli" in Henrik Ibsen's The Master Builder). She has also had roles on television, like the series Hotel Cæsar, and in movies, most notably the comedy 37½. She has a daughter, born in 2004, from a relationship with the actor Mads Ousdal.

References

External links

1971 births
Living people
Norwegian soap opera actresses
Norwegian stage actresses
Norwegian film actresses
21st-century Norwegian actresses